Jean McSorley is long-standing anti-nuclear campaigner, who formed the group "Cumbrians Against a Radioactive Environment" (Core) from her home town of Barrow-in-Furness, England in protest at the local Sellafield plant. As well as fighting compensation cases for Sellafield workers, Core took part in direct action campaigns. It has been incorrectly reported that they earned a string of injunctions.[1]  Neither CORE as a group, nor the individuals involved, have received injunctions; but Greenpeace – who Jean McSorley subsequently worked for - has been served with a number due to its actions against nuclear operations.

Ms McSorley worked as the anti-nuclear coordinator for Greenpeace throughout the 1990s and travelled to Australia and the Far East. She was the senior anti-nuclear campaigner for Greenpeace in the 2000s, and became the victim of an espionage scandal when nuclear power giant EDF committed industrial espionage against Greenpeace. In November 2011, EDF was fined £1.3m and ordered to pay £428,000 in damages to Greenpeace after being found guilty of spying on the environmental group. EDF executive Pierre-Paul François was sentenced to three years’ imprisonment. His deputy, Pascal Durieux, was sentenced to three years’ imprisonment, with two of them suspended.

McSorley has contributed to several academic works on nuclear energy and wrote her own book, Living in the Shadow, in 1990. As of 2011, she still acts as a consultant to Greenpeace.

Jean McSorley lived in Australia from 1990 until 2003, whilst there she was first head of Greenpeace Australia's nuclear campaign before moving to become the Campaign Coordinator for the Nuclear & Energy Campaign in Asia for Greenpeace International.

She has also worked as a policy analyst for The Cabinet Office of New South Wales (Health and Aboriginal Affairs).

She was a member of the Australian Federal Nuclear Committee 2000-2003. Since 2011 she has worked as an independent consultant to Greenpeace and other NGOs.

References

British anti–nuclear power activists
Living people
People associated with Greenpeace
British emigrants to Australia
Australian anti–nuclear power activists
Year of birth missing (living people)